The System Management Interface Tool (SMIT) is a menu-based management tool for the IBM AIX operating system.

It allows a user to navigate a menu hierarchy of commands, rather than using the command line.

See also 

 Object Data Manager
 IBM Web-based System Manager (WSM)
 linuxconf
 Webmin
 YaST
 GAdmintools

References 

User interfaces
AIX SMIT
Unix configuration utilities